The below given is the list of films and albums worked by Anand–Milind as music director duo.

1980s

1990s

2000s

2010s

2020s

References 

Discographies of Indian artists
Films scored by Anand–Milind